Qhiwar (Quechua for a narrow valley, usually with a river, hispanicized spelling Quehuar) is a mountain in the Cusco Region in Peru, about  high. It is situated in the Calca Province, San Salvador District. Qhiwar lies between Hatun Punta in the east and Wallwa Qhata in the southwest.

References 

Mountains of Peru
Mountains of Cusco Region